The 1948 North Dakota Fighting Sioux football team, also known as the Nodaks, was an American football team that represented the University of North Dakota in the North Central Conference (NCC) during the 1948 college football season. In its fourth year under head coach Red Jarrett, the team compiled a 3–7 record (3–3 against NCC opponents), finished in third place out of seven teams in the NCC, and was outscored opponents by a total of 179 to 123. The team played its home games at Memorial Stadium in Grand Forks, North Dakota.

Schedule

References

North Dakota
North Dakota Fighting Hawks football seasons
North Dakota Fighting Sioux football